Eschweilera integricalyx is a species of woody plant in the family Lecythidaceae. It is found only in Colombia.

References

integricalyx
Vulnerable plants
Endemic flora of Colombia
Taxonomy articles created by Polbot